Sea of Solitude is an adventure video game developed by Jo-Mei Games and published by Electronic Arts. The game was released for Windows, PlayStation 4 and Xbox One in July 2019. A director's cut version of the game was announced at The Game Awards 2020, unlike the original version, the game is published by Quantic Dream and was released exclusively for Nintendo Switch in March 2021.

Story
The player controls a young woman named Kay who suffers from such strong loneliness that her inner feelings of hopelessness, anger and worthlessness turn to the outside and she becomes a monster. As Kay, the player explores a seemingly empty flooded city and interacts with its scaly red-eyed creatures to reveal why Kay turned into a monster. Kay's emotions manifest into giant monsters standing in her way, trying to help but also destroy her. Kay needs to interact with and understand their underlying intentions in order to overcome the negative effects of those emotions. The game is in the core an inner dialogue of a person trying to come to terms with their own shortcomings.

Development
The city where the game takes place is based on Berlin. The developers announced the game online in February 2015. Its creative director, Cornelia Geppert, described the project as her most personal and artistic, in how it led her to probe her own fears and emotions following an emotional abusive relationship from 2014 to 2017. However, she noted that several parts of the game are not from her own past.

Electronic Arts published the game under its indie game program EA Originals. The game's release was postponed from spring to summer of 2019 before having a set release date of July 5, 2019.

A director's cut version of the game was announced at The Game Awards 2020, unlike the original version, the game is published by Quantic Dream and was released exclusively for Nintendo Switch on March 4, 2021.

Reception

Sea of Solitude received "mixed or average reviews", according to review aggregator Metacritic.

Destructoid wrote that "Sea of Solitude stands out as heartfelt, almost painfully sincere, so much so that I hesitated to actually put a score on this review at all. It felt almost crass to do so, like being allowed to read a relative's diary, only to give it a thumbs-up or -down." Game Informer said that "Sea of Solitude" provides an insightful look at how mental illness devastates the lives of not just those it affects, but also loved ones on the outside. Kay learns a lot about herself by understanding the value of listening, coming to term with her flaws, and not just empathizing with family but also accepting that a simple fix isn't always possible." The Guardian describes the game "a dazzling and cathartic exploration of mental health" and " a rare and audacious game that tackles depression and its causes head-on".

Other reviews were more mixed. IGN summarised the game by saying that "Sea of Solitude gives you a beautiful world and an intriguing story but the gameplay fails to evolve enough to make this a compelling adventure", while Game Revolution wrote "In essence, it’s a boat that looks nice from the outside until you jump inside and notice all the holes actively trying to sink the whole thing."

The game was nominated for "Games for Impact" at The Game Awards 2019, for "Game, Special Class" at the NAVGTR Awards, and for the Matthew Crump Cultural Innovation Award at the SXSW Gaming Awards. In March 2019, The New York Times highlighted the game as part of a growing trend in the video game industry towards tackling mental health issues.

The game won the Unity (game engine) Award for Best 3D Visuals.

References

External links 
 

2019 video games
Adventure games
Electronic Arts games
Indie video games
Single-player video games
Video games about mental health
Video games developed in Germany
Video games featuring female protagonists
Windows games
PlayStation 4 games
Xbox One games
Nintendo Switch games
Quantic Dream